WYSE International is a worldwide educational charity specialising in the education and development of emerging leaders. Established in 1989, it is a non-governmental organization associated with the United Nations Department of Public Information. It is based in London and has branches in Italy, Brazil, Japan, the Netherlands and a worldwide network of alumni in more than 115 countries. The organization is run on a volunteer basis and its trainers are professional psychologists, leadership development trainers, educators, coaches and business people.

History
In 1989 the organisation was established by a group of educationalists and psychologists.

In 1992 the organisation was named World Youth Service and Enterprise (WYSE International) with a vision to bring together young people from around the world who wanted to make a positive contribution to their communities.

Dr Andrew McDowell then led the organisation to focus on leadership development and with a team of educators, psychologists and business people from around the world created the flagship WYSE International Leadership Programme.

In 1996 WYSE International registered as a UK Charity, with a brief to undertake charitable and consulting work both nationally and internationally. Its UK Registered UK Charity number is 105 3940.

In 1998 WYSE gained recognition as an official Non-Government Organisation (NGO) with the United Nations, Associated with the  Department of Public Information (DPI).

See also
 Think Global (charity)
 Restless Development

References

External links
 WYSE International official website
 WYSE International Youtube channel
 Blog from participant

1989 establishments in the United Kingdom
Educational charities based in the United Kingdom
International organisations based in London
Organisations based in the London Borough of Camden
Youth charities based in the United Kingdom
Youth organizations established in 1989